Michael Moynihan (born 12 January 1968) is an Irish Fianna Fáil politician who has been a Teachta Dála (TD) for the Cork North-West constituency since the 1997 general election.

Moynihan was born in Cork in 1968, but is a native of Kiskeam, County Cork. He was educated locally at Boherbue Comprehensive School, which is located in the village of Boherbue, five miles from Kiskeam.

A dairy farmer by profession, he first became involved in national politics in 1997, when he was elected at the 1997 general election to Dáil Éireann as a Fianna Fáil TD. Moynihan's election caused somewhat of a shock because he succeeded in unseating sitting Fine Gael TD Frank Crowley, in what had been one of Fine Gael's strongest constituencies, where they had held more seats than Fianna Fáil. At the 1997 general election, another candidate, Donal Howard, gained votes in the Kanturk, Banteer, and Kilcorney areas of the constituency; this reduced the share of votes obtained by Frank Crowley, and contributed to his loss of his seat.

Moynihan was Chairman of the Oireachtas Joint Committee on Education and Science from 2004 to 2007. He served as chairman of Ógra Fianna Fáil, the youth wing of the party, until 2005. He topped the poll at the 2002 general election and was re-elected at the 2007, 2011, 2016 and 2020 general elections.

He has served as the Fianna Fáil Spokesperson on Agriculture and Food from 2011 to 2012, Spokesperson on Communications, Energy and Natural Resources from 2012 to 2016 and Opposition Chief Whip from 2016 to 2020.

References

External links
Michael Moynihan's page on the Fianna Fáil website

 

1968 births
Living people
Fianna Fáil TDs
Irish farmers
Members of the 28th Dáil
Members of the 29th Dáil
Members of the 30th Dáil
Members of the 31st Dáil
Members of the 32nd Dáil
Members of the 33rd Dáil
Politicians from County Cork
Alumni of Cork Institute of Technology